Andreas Bielau (born 26 August 1958) is a retired football forward.

During his club career, Bielau played for BSG Sachsenring Zwickau and FC Carl Zeiss Jena in the East German top-flight. After retiring, he managed VfB Auerbach. He made 9 appearances for the East Germany national team.

External links

References

1958 births
Living people
East German footballers
East Germany international footballers
Association football forwards
FSV Zwickau players
FC Carl Zeiss Jena players
20th-century German people
German footballers
East German football managers
German football managers
DDR-Oberliga players